Hypobapta tachyhalotaria is a moth of the family Geometridae. It is found in Tasmania and possibly New South Wales and Queensland.

The wingspan is 39–42 mm for males and 44–48 mm for females. The ground color is light grey and the basal, antemedial and postmedial lines are blackish dark grey. The terminal area is darker on all wings, with a pale grey wavy line.

Etymology
The name is derived from the Greek word ταχυαλωτος (meaning rapidly conquered) and refers to the authors’ opinion that appropriately used data from DNA barcoding campaigns can have an accelerating effect on taxonomy.

References

Moths described in 2009
Pseudoterpnini